Caladenia discoidea, commonly known as the dancing spider orchid, antelope orchid or bee orchid is a species of orchid endemic to the south-west of Western Australia. It is distinguished by its horizontally arranged flowers and unusually short sepals and petals.

Description
The flowers are oriented horizontally, are yellow and green with red stripes, have very short petals and sepals and a rounded, fringed labellum with dark calli. Flowers appear between August and early October.

Taxonomy and naming
Caladenia discoidea was first described by John Lindley in 1840 in A Sketch of the Vegetation of the Swan River Colony. The specific epithet is "from the Latin discoideus (rounded blade and thickened margin), alluding to the rounded labellum shape".

Distribution and habitat
The dancing spider orchid is widespread in the drier areas of the south-west between Kalbarri and Israelite Bay, growing in woodland, sometimes on the edges of salt lakes. It occurs in the Avon Wheatbelt, Esperance Plains, Geraldton Sandplains, Jarrah Forest, Mallee and Swan Coastal Plain biogeographic regions of Western Australia.

Conservation
Caladenia discoidea  is classified as "not threatened" by the Government of Western Australia Department of Parks and Wildlife.

Cultural reference
This species was featured on an Australian postage stamp in 2014.

References

discoidea
Orchids of Western Australia
Endemic orchids of Australia
Plants described in 1840
Endemic flora of Western Australia